Nye-Holman State Forest is a Connecticut state forest located in the town of Tolland. The Willimantic River flows through the forest.

Recreation
The portion of the Willimantic River that flows through the forest is a trout management area restricted to catch and release fly-fishing, the Cole W. Wilde Trout Management Area. An archery range is also within the forest.

References

External links
Nye-Holman State Forest Connecticut Department of Energy and Environmental Protection

Connecticut state forests
Parks in Tolland County, Connecticut
Tolland, Connecticut
Protected areas established in 1931
1931 establishments in Connecticut